The sales of fireworks in Belgium is federally regulated. Since 5 July 2017, the sale of European category F3 fireworks to non-professionals is a criminal offence; the non-professional customer needs to be at least 12 years old for category F1 and at least 16 years old for category F2; the vendor is required to verify the customer's age.

As of 2017, Belgium does not have a federal policy on the lighting of fireworks, although such regulations have been announced in 2015.

Flanders
In Flanders, the Gemeentedecreet (Municipal Decree) gives the 308 municipalities of the Flemish Region the authority to introduce a required licence for lighting fireworks, or to prohibit the ignition of fireworks on certain locations. In almost all Flemish municipalities, an individual can only get a licence in special circumstances (such as weddings). During New Year's Eve, lighting fireworks without a licence is allowed in 35% of the municipalities, in around 50% a permit from the burgemeester (mayor) is required, and around 14% of municipalities have banned consumer fireworks altogether.

In many major cities, professional fireworks shows are held, attended by tens of thousands of people.

Wallonia

Brussels
Due to measures addressing the COVID-19 pandemic in Belgium, the Brussels Capital Region and the City of Brussels temporarily prohibited the use (and the Region also the possession) of fireworks in public places and open-air private properties (gardens, terraces, balconies) from 23 December 2021 to 9 January 2022. The sale of fireworks was still permitted throughout Belgium.

Eupen-Malmedy

See also 
Fireworks law in the United Kingdom
Fireworks policy in the European Union
Fireworks policy in the Netherlands
Fireworks policy in the Republic of Ireland

References 

Belgium
Belgian culture
Law of Belgium
Health in Belgium
Safety in the European Union